Ahansal is a surname which originates from Zaouiat Ahansal. Notable people with the surname include:

 Lahcen Ahansal,  Moroccan athlete
 Mohamad Ahansal (born 1973), Moroccan athlete